Phryganogryllacris is an Asian genus of Orthopterans, sometimes known as 'leaf-folding crickets', in the subfamily Gryllacridinae and tribe Phryganogryllacridini.  Species have been recorded from: India, China, Indochina, Malesia, through to New Guinea.

Species 
The Orthoptera Species File lists:

 Phryganogryllacris arctata Walker, 1869
 Phryganogryllacris arctatiformis Karny, 1925
 Phryganogryllacris aruana Karny, 1931
 Phryganogryllacris bengalensis Griffini, 1913
 Phryganogryllacris brevipennis Li, Liu & Li, 2016
 Phryganogryllacris brevixipha Brunner von Wattenwyl, 1893
 Phryganogryllacris cambodjana Karny, 1929
 Phryganogryllacris differens Griffini, 1908
 Phryganogryllacris discus Gorochov, 2008
 Phryganogryllacris extensa Ingrisch, 2018
 Phryganogryllacris fanjingshanensis Li, Liu & Li, 2016
 Phryganogryllacris gialaiensis Gorochov, 2005
 Phryganogryllacris griseola Karny, 1930
 Phryganogryllacris grobbeni Karny, 1925
 Phryganogryllacris hubeiensis Li, Liu & Li, 2016
 Phryganogryllacris interrupta Li, Liu & Li, 2014
 Phryganogryllacris lobulata Gorochov, 2005
 Phryganogryllacris longicerca Li, Liu & Li, 2014
 Phryganogryllacris mascata Karny, 1937
 Phryganogryllacris mellii Karny, 1926
 Phryganogryllacris mioccana Karny, 1935
 Phryganogryllacris nivea Brunner von Wattenwyl, 1888
 Phryganogryllacris nonangulata Ingrisch, 2018
 Phryganogryllacris parva Li, Liu & Li, 2014
 Phryganogryllacris phryganoides Haan, 1842type species (as Gryllacris phryganoides de Haan = P. phryganoides phryganoides)
 Phryganogryllacris problematica Gorochov, 2005
 Phryganogryllacris pusilla Karny, 1926
 Phryganogryllacris separata Karny, 1926
 Phryganogryllacris sheni Niu & Shi, 1999
 Phryganogryllacris sichuanensis Li, Liu & Li, 2014
 Phryganogryllacris sigillata Li, Liu & Li, 2016
 Phryganogryllacris simalurensis Karny, 1931
 Phryganogryllacris sphegidipraeda Karny, 1924
 Phryganogryllacris subangulata Gorochov, 2005
 Phryganogryllacris subrectis Matsumura & Shiraki, 1908
 Phryganogryllacris superangulata Gorochov, 2005
 Phryganogryllacris teuthroides Karny, 1925
 Phryganogryllacris trusmadi Gorochov, 2008
 Phryganogryllacris vinhphuensis Gorochov, 2005
 Phryganogryllacris xiai Liu & Zhang, 2001

References

External links

Pinned specimen on The Biodiversity of Singapore

Ensifera genera
Gryllacrididae
Orthoptera of Indo-China
Orthoptera of Malesia